The Pănicel is a right tributary of the river Sohodol in Romania. It flows into the Sohodol near Râșnov.

References

Rivers of Romania
Rivers of Brașov County